Kane Richmond (born Frederick William Bowditch, December 23, 1906 – March 22, 1973) was an American film actor of the 1930s and 1940s, mostly appearing in cliffhangers and serials. He is best known today for his portrayal of the character Lamont Cranston in The Shadow films in addition to his leading role in the successful serials Spy Smasher and Brick Bradford.

Early years
Richmond was born in Minneapolis, Minnesota, the son of Pearlie Watkins Bowditch and Mary Elizabeth (Waters) Bowditch. He had a sister, Marie, and a brother, Russell. He attended St. Thomas College and the University of Minnesota, playing football at both schools. He moved to Hollywood in the late 1920s to pursue a career in acting.

Film 
Before becoming an actor, Richmond (then still known as Fred Bowditch) was a film salesman. In its entry on Richmond, The Film Encyclopedia relates: "[H]e was on a business trip to Hollywood when a Universal executive asked him to test for the lead in The Leather Pushers two-reel action series. He got the part and went on to appear in many other films through the late 40s."

He received his first film roles in 1929, appearing in Song of Love, followed by Their Own Desire, both of which were uncredited. In 1930 he had two more uncredited roles, then landed the lead role in the boxing serial The Leather Pushers, an 11-film series that ran into 1931. Richmond did all of the fight scenes in the serial himself and suffered a broken nose (twice) and a broken ankle as a result. From the remainder of 1931 through 1939 Richmond appeared in fifty films, many of which were cliffhangers, serials, and B-movies.

In The Devil Tiger (1934), Director Clyde E. Elliott allowed his star, Richmond, to fight a 25-foot python. Richmond hated doubles and had insisted on playing the scene himself.  The actor succeeded in holding the snake's snapping mouth away from his face while struggling to free himself from the triple coils around his body.  At the height of the struggle, the heroine, Marion Burns, runs in and saves the hero from the python.  Burns had to fight the snake too, in order to get at Richmond's pistol, with which she was supposed to shoot the python.

In the serial Spy Smasher for Republic Studios Richmond played not only the title character, but his twin brother (a character not present in the comic book).

Richmond appeared in several Charlie Chan films, and in 1940 landed a main supporting role in Knute Rockne All American, which starred Pat O'Brien, Gale Page, and Ronald Reagan. From 1940 through 1946 he appeared in thirty films, including his best known roles today, three films in The Shadow series, starring opposite Barbara Read. Following these films, his movie career declined considerably, with only three film roles in 1947 and 1948. During the 1950s and 1960s he appeared on several television series until 1966, when he retired. Richmond was residing in Corona Del Mar, California, at the time of his death at the age of 66.

Personal life
Richmond was married in 1934 to actress Marion Burns. The marriage lasted until his death. They had 2 children.

Selected filmography

References

External links

 
 

1906 births
1973 deaths
American male film actors
Burials at Holy Cross Cemetery, Culver City
Male film serial actors
Male actors from Minneapolis
The Shadow
20th-century American male actors